Annat may refer to:

In geography
 Annat, a settlement in the Highland region of Scotland
 Annat, a settlement in the Argyll and Bute region of Scotland

Other uses
 Anat, a Canaanite goddess